Fantu is an Ethiopian given name and surname. Notable people with the name include:

Fantu Magiso (born 1992), Ethiopian middle-distance runner 
Fantu Worku (born 1999), Ethiopian middle-distance runner 
Manaye Fantu (born 1990), Ethiopian football forward 

Ethiopian given names